Ruby Peak is a peak rising on the east side of Olsen Valley to the southwest of Jason Peak, South Georgia. The name appears to be first used on a 1930 British Admiralty chart.
 

Mountains and hills of South Georgia